The 8th Regiment California Volunteer Infantry was an infantry regiment in the Union Army during the American Civil War. Raised in the last year of the war, it spent its entire term of service serving in posts around San Francisco Bay, and on the Columbia River, attached to the Department of the Pacific, before mustering out in late 1865.

History 
The regiment was mustered into Federal service on March 31, 1865 under the command of Regular Army officer Colonel Allen L. Anderson, attached to the District of California in the Department of the Pacific. It was the last California regiment raised under the congressional act of July 1864, and had a total enrollment of 960 in ten companies. Its headquarters was initially located at Alcatraz Island but moved to Fort Point in April. The companies of the regiment were raised during late 1864 and early 1865: Company A in Watsonville, B in Sacramento, C in San Jose, D, E, and F in San Francisco, G in Marysville, H in Calaveras County, I in Yuba and Sierra Counties, and K in Placerville and Sacramento. They mustered in at San Francisco before the regimental headquarters: Company A on November 17, 1864, B on December 5, G on January 5, 1865, E on January 25, C on January 28, D and F on February 14, I on February 6, and K on February 25.

Companies C, D, I, and K were stationed on Fort Point for their entire service, while A and B were initially stationed there. Companies E, G, and H were stationed on Alcatraz Island for the duration of their service, while Company F was at Point Blunt on Angel Island. In February, Company A moved to Cape Disappointment at the mouth of the Columbia River in Washington Territory, where it remained until August 17, when it transferred to Fort Dalles in Oregon. While at Cape Disappointment, seven soldiers from the company participated in the rescue of seven survivors from the wrecked barque Industry on March 15. Company B was ordered to Fort Stevens at the mouth of the Columbia in Oregon on April 17, and arrived there on April 26. Both companies became part of the District of Oregon upon their relocation. On October 11, Company B left to return to Fort Point for mustering out. The entire regiment was mustered out at Fort Point on October 24.

See also
List of California Civil War Union units

References

Citations

Bibliography 

Units and formations of the Union Army from California
Military units and formations of the United States in the Indian Wars
Watsonville, California
Military units and formations established in 1865
1865 establishments in California
Military units and formations disestablished in 1865